Roy Charles Stone (born 14 April 1966), is a former judoka who competed for England.

Judo career
Stone became champion of Great Britain, winning the lightweight division at the British Judo Championships in 1985.

He represented England and won a gold medal in the 71 kg lightweight category, at the 1990 Commonwealth Games in Auckland, New Zealand.

Personal life
He is a science and maths teacher by trade and lives in northern Sweden.

References

1966 births
English male judoka
Commonwealth Games medallists in judo
Commonwealth Games gold medallists for England
Judoka at the 1990 Commonwealth Games
Living people
Medallists at the 1990 Commonwealth Games